Los Abuelos de la Nada (the Grandparents of Nothingness) is the first studio album of Argentine rock group Los Abuelos de la Nada. It was published in 1982, after 12 years of inactivity grouping Miguel Abuelo, and produced by Charly Garcia. Among the songs stand out successes "Sin Gamulán", "No te enamores nunca de aquel marinero bengalí", "Tristeza de la ciudad", "Ir a mas", "Guindilla ardiente", "Te vas rica" and "Creo que es un sueño mas".

Track listing
 No te enamores nunca de aquel marinero bengalí [Don't Ever Fall In Love With That Bengali Sailor] (Miguel Abuelo, Cachorro López, Gustavo Bazterrica, Andrés Calamaro) (5:48)
 Sin Gamulán [Without A Coat] (Calamaro) (3:15)
 En la cama o en el suelo [In Bed Or On The Floor] (Abuelo) (4:03)
 Como debo andar [How Shall I Walk] (Gustavo Bazterrica) (3:25)
 Ir a más [Go Further] (Abuelo, Charly López) (3:28)
 Tristeza de la ciudad [City Sadness] (Gringui Herrera]) (3:37)
 Creo que es un sueño más [I Think It's Another Dream] (Abuelo, López) (3:46)
 Levantando temperatura [Rising Temperature] (Calamaro) (2:29)
 Guindilla ardiente [Burning Chili] (Abuelo, López) (3:58)
 Te vas rica [You Go Hot] (Bazterrica) (4:51)
 Se me olvidó que te olvidé [I Forgot That I Forgot You] (Ismael Molá) (2:03)

Personnel
 Miguel Abuelo: lead vocals, percussion
 Andrés Calamaro: keyboards, vocals
 Cachorro López: bass, backing vocals
 Gustavo Bazterrica: guitar, vocals
 Daniel Melingo: saxophone, clarinet, backing vocals
 Polo Corbella: drums

1982 debut albums